Loch Goil; is a small sea loch forming part of the coast of the Cowal peninsula in Argyll and Bute, Scotland.  The sea loch is entirely within the Loch Lomond and The Trossachs National Park.

It is an arm of Loch Long.  The village of Lochgoilhead stands at its head. Located in the Loch Lomond and the Trossachs National Park, Lochgoilhead sits at the head of Loch Goil, a fjord type sea loch. Only an hour from the Erskine Bridge, Glasgow Airport the M8 and Glasgow. The village is accessed from the Rest & Be Thankful pass by way of a  single-track road. The area is surrounded by hills and mountains, with loch views, and a range of accommodation, leisure activities and entertainment. Carrick Castle lies on the west shore 4 miles (6.4 km) south of Lochgoilhead.

The landscape at Loch Goil shows its remoteness and Highland grandeur with the Arrochar Alps surrounding with conifers in the Highlands of Scotland.

It is used for exercises by Trident submarines from HMNB Clyde at Faslane.

In 2014 Loch Goil was declared a Nature Conservation Marine Protected Area (NCMPA).

Fisheries

Several Scottish Sea Fishing shore records are attributed to the Loch:

References

External links

 Map showing Loch Goyll (Loch Goil), circa 1600, National Library of Scotland
 HMNB Clyde - website

Goil
Goil
Cowal
Nature Conservation Marine Protected Areas of Scotland